Elmira Bayrasli is the author of the book From The Other Side of The World: Extraordinary Entrepreneurs, Unlikely Places (published by Public Affairs, 2015), which looks at the rise of entrepreneurship on a global level, and the co-founder, of Foreign Policy Interrupted. From The Other Side of The World: Extraordinary Entrepreneurs, Unlikely Places, profiles seven entrepreneurs from seven countries overcoming seven obstacles. Those entrepreneurs and countries include: Turkey: Bulent Celebi, Airties; Nigeria: Tayo Oviosu, Paga; Pakistan: Monis Rahman, Rozee.pk; Mexico: Enrique Junco Gomez, Optima Energia; India: Shaffi Mather, 1298; Russia, Yana Yakovleva; China: Lei Jun, Xiaomi.

Bayrasli is a professor at Bard College, in the Globalization and International Affairs Program, where she teaches Foreign Policy in the Time of the Internet. She is also an adjunct professor at New York University, teaching foreign policy and global entrepreneurship.

In 2014, New America awarded her a fellowship, focusing on Turkey and the Middle East. Bayrasli is also a fellow at the World Policy Institute. She holds a B.A in political science from New York University and an M.A. in Middle Eastern languages and literatures from Columbia University.

Bayrasli is a regular contributor on global entrepreneurship for Techcrunch. She also provides analysis on foreign policy. Her work has appeared in The New York Times, Reuters, Foreign Affairs, The Wall Street Journal, The Washington Post, Quartz, Fortune, Forbes, CNN, NPR, BBC, Al Jazeera, and Charlie Rose. She is a regular guest on the BBC’s Business Matters. In 2010, she wrote "Fashioning A New Future For Pakistan", about Bareeze in Forbes.

In 1994 she joined Madeleine K. Albright’s team at the U.S. Mission to the United Nations. When President Clinton was re-elected in 1996 and appointed Albright to be chief foreign policymaker, Bayrasli received a White House Presidential Appointment assigned to the U.S. Secretary of State’s Office. In 1998, when Richard Holbrooke became the lead negotiator to break the Cyprus stalemate, Bayrasli joined his special negotiator’s office.

In 2002, Bayrasli was assigned to the Organization for Security and Co-operation in Europe’s Mission. As the Mission’s Chief Spokesperson and Director of Press and Public Information she tackled the thorny issues of post-war recovery and development. After spearheading the Mission’s 10th anniversary activities in 2005, which included an awarding-winning documentary on the Roma, a TV series on Bosnia’s top stations, and the publication of a ten-year Mission retrospective, she returned to New York in January 2006, where she served as a vice president for the global non-profit supporting entrepreneurs, Endeavor.

Since 2006, Bayrasli has been a leading voice for high-growth entrepreneurship in the worldwide. She is a frequent speaker at conferences and commentator on entrepreneurship matters. She has addressed the United Nations Conference on Trade & Development in Geneva, been a delegate for the Skoll World Forum for Social Entrepreneurship and the Clinton Global Initiative.

Bayrasli was a term member of the Council on Foreign Relations, a member of the Women’s Foreign Policy Group and the New York Women’s Social Entrepreneur Club. She is an advisory board member for Turkish Women’s International Network, Turkish Philanthropy Funds and the Pakistani-based social enterprise Invest2Innovate. She has served as a mentor for the Unreasonable Institute.

References

External links

Living people
Bard College faculty
New York University faculty
Year of birth missing (living people)
American women political scientists
American political scientists
New York University alumni
Columbia University alumni
American women academics
21st-century American women